Yeleswaram or Elesvaram is a town in the Kakinada district in the state of Andhra Pradesh in India.

A freedom fighter and Indian National Congress Leader Chandaka Apparao belongs to this place.

Geography
It has an average elevation of 60 meters (200 feet).

Transport

Yeleswaram is located 9km to NH 16. The major railway station to the town is Samalkot railway station. The nearest airport to Yeleswaram is Rajahmundry Airport which is 45km away.

References 

Cities and towns in Kakinada district